Ali Hamad Madhad Saif Al-Badwawi (born 22 December 1972) is an Emirati football referee.

Al-Badwawi became a FIFA referee in 2005. He was a referee at the 2007 and 2011 AFC Asian Cup, as well as the AFC Champions League. In international competitions, he officiated at the 2011 FIFA U-17 World Cup and qualifiers for the 2010 and 2014 World Cups.

In March 2013, FIFA named Al-Badwawi to a list of 52 candidate referees for the 2014 FIFA World Cup. On 2 April 2013, he sent off Anawin Jujeen in AFC Champions League game between Jiangsu Sainty and Buriram United.

References

External links 
 
 

1972 births
Living people
Emirati football referees
AFC Asian Cup referees